Stewartfield is a historic residence on the campus of Spring Hill College in Mobile, Alabama, United States.  It was built in 1849 in a Greek Revival style. The building was placed on the National Register of Historic Places as a part of the 19th Century Spring Hill Neighborhood Thematic Resource on October 18, 1984.

See also
Spring Hill College

References

National Register of Historic Places in Mobile, Alabama
Houses in Mobile, Alabama
Spring Hill College
Houses on the National Register of Historic Places in Alabama
Houses completed in 1849
Greek Revival houses in Alabama
1849 establishments in Alabama